Bjerreby is a small town located on the island of Tåsinge in south-central Denmark, in Svendborg Municipality. It is located three kilometers south of Lundby, 12 kilometers south of Svendborg and 10 kilometers west of Rudkøbing.

References 

Cities and towns in the Region of Southern Denmark
Svendborg Municipality